Electoral district no. 1 was one of the multi-member electoral districts of the Riigikogu, the national legislature of Estonia. The district was established in 1992 when the Riigikogu was re-established following Estonia's independence from the Soviet Union. It was abolished in 1995. It covered south Tallinn.

Election results

Detailed

1992
Results of the 1992 parliamentary election held on 20 September 1992:

The following candidates were elected:
 Personal mandates - Tiit Käbin (I), 6,427 votes.
 Compensatory mandates - Tiit Arge (I), 280 votes; Lauri Einer (I), 195 votes; Indrek Kannik (I), 1,509 votes; Tunne Kelam (ERSP), 2,350 votes; Jaan Kross (M), 2,985 votes; Ülo Laanoja (M), 341 votes; Katrin Linde (EK), 985 votes; Tõnu Tepandi (KK), 563 votes; and Liina Tõnisson (R), 1,737 votes.

References

01
01
01
Riigikogu electoral district, 1